Søren Pape Poulsen (born 31 December 1971) is a Danish politician, who is a member of the Folketing for the Danish Conservative Party. He has been the leader of the party since 2014. From 2016 to 2019 he served as Justice Minister of Denmark, and from 2009 to 2014 he served as mayor of Viborg Municipality.

Political career

Pape Poulsen was elected to the municipal council in Bjerringbro Municipality in 2001. Following the Danish Municipal Reform in 2007, Bjerringbro Municipality became part of the new Viborg Municipality and Pape Poulsen continued his work in the new municipal council. Following the local elections of 2009, he formed a majority with the Social Democrats, the Socialist People's Party and the Danish People's Party and became mayor in Viborg. At the 2013 election, the Conservatives doubled their mandates and Pape Poulsen was reelected as mayor.

On 6 August 2014, Lars Barfoed stepped down as leader of the Conservative People's Party and said that he would like Pape Poulsen to succeed him as leader. The following day, the parliamentary group unanimously elected Pape Poulsen as political leader until the party congress on 26 September 2014. He was mayor until Wednesday, 3 September 2014 when Torsten Nielsen from the Conservative People's Party became mayor.

On 28 November 2016, Pape Poulsen became Minister of Justice in Prime Minister Lars Løkke Rasmussen's third cabinet. He was minister until 25 June 2019.

On 15 August 2022 Pape Poulsen, with the Conservatives at some of their highest polling in years, declared he was going into the 2022 election as a candidate for the prime minister position. Polling two months before the election suggested that Pape Poulsen was the clear favorite between him and fellow right wing candidate Jakob Ellemann-Jensen, but as the election neared Pape Poulsen became increasingly less popular, and ended up losing 2 seats in the election held on 1 November 2022.

Personal life
Pape Poulsen is educated in shipping at Grundfos.

On 10 August 2014, Poulsen came out as gay, simultaneously announcing his relationship with Josué Medina Vásquez. Originally from the Dominican Republic, he and Pape Poulsen were engaged in 2017, later marrying in 2021. On 14 September 2022, Pape Poulsen announced that he and Medina were divorcing, following suggestions that Medina had given Poulsen false information about his background.

References

External links

 

|-

1971 births
Living people
People from Viborg Municipality
Conservative People's Party (Denmark) politicians
LGBT conservatism
Danish LGBT politicians
Danish gay men
Gay politicians
Danish Justice Ministers
Government ministers of Denmark
LGBT legislators
LGBT mayors
Mayors of places in Denmark
Danish municipal councillors
Members of the Folketing 2015–2019
Members of the Folketing 2019–2022
Leaders of the Conservative People's Party (Denmark)
Members of the Folketing 2022–2026